Daniel Blomqvist, known as Puppet, born 1970 in Västerås, Sweden, is one of Sweden's most well-known graffiti artists, often referred to as one of the first graffiti writers in Europe.

References 

1970 births
Swedish artists
Graffiti artists
Living people